Pontianak Harum Sundal Malam 2 is a 2005 Malaysian Malay-language horror movie directed and written by Shuhaimi Baba released in Malaysia on 24 November 2005. It is the sequel to Pontianak Harum Sundal Malam (2004). Starring Maya Karin, the film was distributed by Pesona Pictures.

Cast
 Maya Karin as Meriam, Maria's mother, Laila's cousin, Danial's wife / Maria, Meriam and Danial's daughter, Laila's niece and foster daughter, Bayang's friend
 Rusdi Ramli as Zali, Marsani's son, Asmadi's adopted brother / Joyo, Tok Guru's assistant, Zali's new identity after he lose his memory
 Rosyam Nor as Asmadi, Marsani's adopted son, Zali's adopted brother, Zai's husband, Norman's adopted father
 Ida Nerina as Bayang, Sitam's younger sister, Maria's friend
 Kavita Sidhu as Ana, Norman's wife
 Nanu Baharuddin as Laila, Meriam's cousin, Maria's aunt and foster mother
 Zahim Albakhri as Tok Guru, Kuda Kepang dance teacher, Tok Selampit's relative
 Aziz Sattar as Tok Selampit, Meriam and Laila's dance teacher
 Haiza as Zai, Asmadi's wife
 Pierre Andre as Purnama, Bayang's friend
 Zaibo as Penarik Beca
 Shahronizam Noor as Danial, Meriam's husband, Maria's father
 Dilla Ahmad as Kalsom, servant of Asmadi's family
 Khir Rahman as Tok Urut
 Aznil Nawawi as Pasangan Kekasih Lelaki
 Raja Azura as Pasangan Kekasih Wanita
 Romi Suhendra as Pengangkat Najis 
 S. Shamsuddin as Sitam and Bayang's father
 Rosnani Jamil as Mak Long
 Mariani as Mak Mah
 Azri Iskandar as Marsani
 Yusmal Ghazali as Sarjono

Possible sequel
Maya Karin revealed in August 2019 that the idea for the third sequel of Pontianak Harum Sundal Malam is in the works.

References

External links
 

2005 films
2005 horror films
2000s ghost films
Malay-language films
Malaysian horror films
Vampires in film
Malaysian sequel films
Films directed by Shuhaimi Baba
Pesona Pictures films
Films produced by Shuhaimi Baba
Films with screenplays by Shuhaimi Baba
Malaysian ghost films